

The CAMS 36 was a 1920s French flying boat designed and built by Chantiers Aéro-Maritimes de la Seine. It was originally conceived as a single-seat fighter but evolved as a racer to compete in the 1922 Schneider Trophy race. Lack of funds in 1922 and an accident in 1923 meant the two aircraft built failed to participate in a Schneider race.

Design and development
Originally designed as a single-seat biplane flying-boat fighter, the CAMS 36 was modified to compete in the 1922 Schneider Trophy. Originally built with a pusher-propeller this was changed to a tractor arrangement for the  Hispano-Suiza 8Fd piston engine. Twin vertical wing bracing struts were changed to a single I-type strut. Although the racer proved to be fast in the air, lack of funds prevented the two aircraft from competing.

For the 1923 race one of the aircraft was modified with a larger  Hispano-Suiza 8Fd piston engine. The I-type struts were changed back to a more conventional arrangement. The new variant was designated the CAM 36bis. On the day of the contest, the 36bis, piloted by Lieutenant Pelletier d'Oisy, collided with a yacht at anchor on the Solent and the damaged aircraft was prevented from racing.

Variants
CAMS 36
Prototype flying-boat fighter
CAMS 36
Modified for racing and powered by a  Hispano-Suiza 8Fd engine.
CAMS 36bis
Further modifications for the 1923 race, powered by a  Hispano-Suiza 8Fd engine.

Specifications (CAMS 36 racer)

References

Notes

Bibliography

External links
 Aviafrance : CAMS 36

Schneider Trophy
Single-engined tractor aircraft
Biplanes
1920s French sport aircraft
Flying boats
36
Aircraft first flown in 1922